This is a list of football clubs in the Republic of Moldova. The list only includes clubs that currently play in the Moldovan league system. The list is updated as of the 2020–21 season.

Moldovan National Division 
Codru Lozova
Dacia Buiucani
Dinamo-Auto Tiraspol
Florești
Milsami Orhei
Petrocub Hîncești
Sfîntul Gheorghe Suruceni
Sheriff Tiraspol
Speranța Nisporeni
Zimbru Chișinău

Moldovan "A" Division 
Bălți
Cahul-2005
Fălești
Grănicerul Glodeni
Iskra Rîbnița
Olimp Comrat
Real Succes Chișinău
Sheriff-2 Tiraspol
Sireți
Spartanii Selemet
Speranța Drochia
Sucleia
Tighina
Victoria Bardar

Moldovan "B" Division

North 
Bogzești
Codru-Juniori
Cruiz-Plus
Edineț
FCM Ungheni
Inter Soroca
Mănoilești
Olimpia Natalievca
Pepeni
Rîșcani
Sîngerei
Visoca

South 
Academia Viitorul
AFR Ialoveni
Cimișlia
Congaz
Cricova
Maiak Chirsova
Saksan
Sinteza Căușeni
Slobozia Mare
Socol Copceac
Sporting Trestieni
Văsieni

External links 
 Full list of football clubs in Moldova - moldova.sports.md

 
Moldova
Clubs
Football clubs